Mount Arcuentu (Monte Arcuentu), elevation 785 m (2,575 ft), is a volcanic massif situated in southwestern Sardinia, northwest of Arbus.

See also
 Arbus, Sardinia
 Costa Verde
 Montevecchio
 Province of Medio Campidano

Sources
 Ignazio Camarda (edited by), Montagne di Sardegna, Sassari, Carlo Delfino, 1993. .
 Bacchetta, C. Pontecorvo; R. Vacca (2007). La flora del Monte Arcuentu (Sardegna sud occidentale). Webbia 62 (2): 175–204.

Mountains of Sardinia